Parveen Rana (born 12 November 1992) is an Indian freestyle wrestler. He gained recognition after winning a gold medal at the Youth Commonwealth Games in 2008. In 2019, he won the silver medal in the men's 79 kg event at the 2019 Asian Wrestling Championships held in Xi'an, China.

Early life 

Parveen, son of Udaybhan Rana and Rajbala, was born in the village Qutubgarh, Delhi. His father identified his skills at an early age . He started wrestling at the age of five, under the guidance of his elder brother.

He currently trains in Philadelphia in United States under the guidance of Olympian medalist Yogeshwar Dutt. Yogeshwar Dutt is role model of Parveen Rana .
His wrestling relies primarily on swift counter-attacks.

Wrestling career 
Rana first gained international attention when he won a gold medal at the 3rd Youth Commonwealth Games in 2008. He went on to win a bronze medal in the 2011 Junior Wrestling World Championship in Bucharest, followed by the 66 kg freestyle title at the 2012 Hari Ram Indian Grand Prix Wrestling Championships, when he was 20 years old. In 2013, he won gold medals at the Senior National Wrestling Championship in Kolkata and the Commonwealth Wrestling Championship in Johannesburg.

In June 2014, Rana sustained a career-threatening neck injury, but made a remarkable comeback to win the gold medal at the Senior National Games and represent India in the 70 kg category at the 2014 Asian Games. The following year, he was the first Indian male wrestler acquired by the Punjab Royals franchise of the Pro Wrestling League.

Rana was chosen to represent India at the 2016 Summer Olympics in Rio de Janeiro after the earlier qualifier, Narsingh Pancham, failed a doping test. However, the decision was reversed after Pancham was cleared by the National Anti-Doping Agency.

Achievements 

 Silver medal, Asian Wrestling Championship, Xian, China, 2019
 Silver medal, Commonwealth Wrestling Championship, Johannesburg, South Africa, 2017
 Gold medal, Commonwealth Wrestling Championship, Johannesburg, 2013
 Gold medal, Dave Schultz Memorial, United States, 2014
 Gold medal, Senior Nationals, Kolkata 2013
 Gold medal, 1st Hari Ram Indian Grand Prix Tournament, New Delhi, 2012
 Bronze medal, Junior Asian Wrestling Championship, Almaty, 2012
 Bronze medal, Asian Senior Wrestling Championship, Korea, 2012
 Bronze medal, Dave Schultz Memorial International, USA, 2012
 Bronze medal, Junior Wrestling World Championship, Bucharest, 2011
 Silver medal, 55th Senior National Wrestling Championship, Ranchi, 2010
 Gold medal, Cadet Asian Wrestling Championship, Tashkent, 2008
 Gold medal, 3rd Commonwealth Youth Games, Pune, 2008

References 

Indian male sport wrestlers
1992 births
Wrestlers at the 2014 Asian Games
Living people
Place of birth missing (living people)
Asian Games competitors for India
Asian Wrestling Championships medalists
21st-century Indian people